June Boland was an English romance writer who wrote 33 novels in the Interwar period, from 1920 to 1940.

Life
Boland was a very popular writer in her day, with her stories serialized in newspapers including The Evening Telegraph and the Dundee Courier. She was also a keen skier who established an indoor ski school, which is reflected in several of her books such as her 1926 novel "The Lure of the Snow".

Bibliography
 "The Charmer." (1920)
 "The Girl in Crimson." (1920)
 "The Great Red Dawn." (1920)
 "Her Rebel Heart." (1921)
 "The Right Man." (1921)
 "The Girl from America." (1922)
 "Love Left Out." (1923)
 "The Newcomer." (1923)
 "For the Sake o' Somebody." (1924)
 "Humpy." (1924)
 "The Master Wooer." (1924)
 "The Beauty in the Background." (1925)
 "Her Second Choice." (1925)
 "His Unknown Wife." (1925)
 "Lost and Won." (1925)
 "Another Woman's Name." (1926)
 "Kirsty at the Manse." (1926)
 "The Lure of the Snow." (1926)
 "Robbed of Happiness." (1926)
 "A Bargain for Love." (1927)
 "Her Splendid Bondage." (1927)
 "Her Stolen Name." (1928)
 "Hôtel Splendide." (1928)
 "Anne Bannister." (1928)
 "A Tyrant in Love." (1929)
 "The Fortunate Lady." (1930)
 "A One-Man Girl." (1931)
 "The Alabaster Nymph." (1932)
 "Ishmael's Daughter." (1932)
 "A Desperate Cure." (1935)
 "The Black Forest Inn." (1936)
 "The Secret of Westmayne. By June Boland. (His Dancing Daughter. By Mrs. Frances Brown.)." (1937)
 "The Courtly Beggar." (1940)

External links
  Works by June Boland in the British Library

References

20th-century English novelists
English romantic fiction writers
English female skiers
20th-century English women
20th-century English people